The US Yachts US 305 is an American sailboat that was designed by William Garden as a cruiser and first built in 1978.

The US 305 is a development of the 1977 Buccaneer 305, which was built by Buccaneer Yachts, also a division of Bayliner.

Production
The design was built by US Yachts, a division of Bayliner, in the United States, starting in 1978, but it is now out of production.

Design
The US 305 is a recreational keelboat, built predominantly of fiberglass, with wood trim. It has a masthead sloop rig, a raked stem, a nearly plumb transom, an internally mounted spade-type rudder controlled by a wheel and a fixed fin keel. It displaces  and carries  of ballast.

A Swedish Volvo MD11C diesel engine was a factory option.

The design has sleeping accommodation for six people, with a double "V"-berth in the bow cabin, an "L"-shaped settee and a straight settee in the main cabin and an aft cabin with a double berth on the starboard side. The galley is located on the port side just forward of the companionway ladder. The galley is "L"-shaped and is equipped with a three-burner stove and a sink. A navigation station is opposite the galley, on the starboard side. The head is located just aft of the bow cabin on the port side.

For sailing the design may be equipped with one of a number of jibs, genoas or a storm jib.

See also
List of sailing boat types

References

Keelboats
1970s sailboat type designs
Sailing yachts 
Sailboat type designs by William Garden
Sailboat types built by US Yachts